Bullets is a Finnish ten-part television crime drama, which premiered on 19 October 2018 on MTV3. Series rights were sold in over 30 countries, including United Kingdom, Germany and Spain. In Australia Bullets was broadcast on SBS-TV's streaming service, On Demand from 13 June 2019. The action is set in Helsinki (Finland), Belgium and North Caucasus with filming in Finland, Belgium and Georgia. The main protagonists are Mari Saari (Krista Kosonen), an undercover Supo officer and Timo Viita (Tommi Korpela), a narcotics superintendent who investigate the activities of Madina Taburova (Sibel Kekilli), a wanted terrorist, who has arrived in Helsinki as a drug mule. A ruthless criminal, Juri Borodin (Dragomir Mrsic), or "ghost", pursues Madina for his own schemes.

Plot 

In 2002, early in the War in Afghanistan, Madina meets Jumanah, joins her "Brides of Allah". They prepare female suicide bombers or "bullets": harmless until loaded and aimed at targets. Madina's husband Aslan was killed by Russians; their daughter, Alba was taken by UN nurses. From 2005 to 2015 Madina travels across Europe, orchestrating numerous terrorist activities using "bullets". In 2016 Madina fakes her death in Paris, two years later in Belgium she becomes "Zamira". However she is forced to be a drug mule by "the Arabian", to get into Finland. In Helsinki both Mari and Timo are watching drugs exchanged by Almaz and Jari. Mari chases Jari but he escapes after killing Jaana. Mari is arrested by Timo as a suspect but he's forced to release her by Juha.

Mari becomes an undercover social worker at Almaz' refugee center. Almaz collects drugs from mules and passes them to Jari. Madina arrives at the center but falls ill when one of her internal packages leaks. Mari saves Madina's life and takes her to hospital. Juri is hunting Madina and follows her trail to Belgium, killing "the Arabian" and his dealers. Karla orders Mari to work with Timo on Jari's drug network. Juri arrives in Helsinki and successively kills Almaz and Jari. Madina is threatened by Juri but she's rescued by Timo and Mari. Timo organises a safe house for Madina, however Juri finds her, blackmails her into cooperation by threatening Alba. Mari starts dating Kim. Madina gets a job as a hotel cleaner. She starts recruiting Roza and Zara. Mari tells Madina she's found Alba and tries to convince her to meet.

Madina is initially scared off by Juri's threats. Roza and Zara start working with Madina at the hotel. Mari sends Alba to Madina, they speak. Juri's henchmen snatch Madina off streets but she escapes. Sayid collects Alba from her home. Madina and Mari arrive. Juri threatens Alba's life and orders Madina to kill Mari. Mari is shot by Madina. Mari injured, diffuses a bomb left by Juri. Juri's van with Madina, Alba and Sayid stopped by hotel security. They carry chemical explosives. Leonid and Juri kill security. Russian president has arrived at hotel. Sayid places chemicals on a trolley, which is taken upstairs by Zara. Alba wears fake bomb vest, Leonid wants her shot but Mari shows its a false detonator. Explosion rips through third floor. Mari rushes upstairs to roof. Sayid's dying, Madina and Juri strugle over his gun. Alba arrives on roof. Juri killed by Mari, Madina dies of wounds. "Interior Minister" decides to lay blame on Madina and not mention connection of Russian agents.

Cast

Main cast 

According to sources:
 Krista Kosonen as an unnamed undercover Finnish Security Intelligence Service ("Supo") officer, her latest alias is "Mari Kristina Saari", a social worker at a refugee center. Previous aliases include "Nina Elina Ojamäki" and "Ulla Enni Kimmonen"
 Inna Bodson as "girl" (12-year-old "Mari"), an orphan after parents killed in car accident, raised by Karla
 Sibel Kekilli as Madina Taburova, Chechen-born terrorist, poses as "Zamira" a refugee, drug courier. Actually looking for her daughter, Alba
 Tommi Korpela as Timo Viita, Drug Unit's Detective Superintendent, married to Anna, father of Ronja, tries to destroy Jari's drug network, has family problems, eventually separated from Anna
 Dragomir Mrsic as Juri Borodin, former  Russian Special Forces commander, intelligence officer, now works for "Oligarch" criminal network, hunts Madina, referred to as "ghost" by Supo and Timo's unit
 Jani Volanen as Jaska Lahti, narcotics officer, Timo's subordinate, generally accedes to Timo's methods
 Leo Honkonen as Vili Porkka, narcotics officer, Timo's subordinate, often criticises Timo's methods
 Adra Al-Aliáyat as Alba Kavén, Kerttu's adoptive teenage daughter, Madina's biological daughter
 Outi Mäenpää as Karla Tuomi, Supo Senior Inspector, Mari's superior, raised Mari
 Nika Savolainen as Zara Egorova, Dagestani woman, Helsinki resident, Konstantin's wife, market stall owner, recruited by Madina
 Jasmin Mora as Roza Mazri, secondary student, bullied by fellow students, recruited by Madina
 Sherwan Haji as Sayid, Juri's henchman, helps organise Helsinki hotel plot
 Koen De Bouw as "Oligarch", Geneva-based businessman, criminal over-lord, Juri's boss

Additional cast 

  as Juha Puistola, Helsinki Head of Internal Affairs, previously investigated Timo's squad for misconduct, schemes for advancement
  as Anna Viita, Timo's disgruntled wife, Ronja's mother, later separated from Timo
  as Jari Pietani Holma, Timo's former informant, Helsinki drug lord
 Tibo Vandenborre as Leonid Oltsyn, Russian president's chief bodyguard, security consultant, arrives at Helsinki hotel
 Nabil Mallat as "the Arabian" (Mahmoud Hassan), Belgian drug lord, gives Madina new passport, makes her a drug mule
 Lukas de Wolf as Aslan, Chechen resident, Madina's husband, father of Alba
 Dahlia Pessemiers as Jumanah, leader of female terrorists, "Brides of Allah", creates "bullets", recruited and trained Madina
 Sachli Gholamalizad as Zamira Hoxha, North Caucasus-Russian refugee, Belgian-resident
 Oona Airoloa as Jaana Kulmala, Mari's colleague, undercover at Helsinki airport
 Laura Malmivaara as Kerttu Kavén, Alba's adoptive mother, jewelry shop assistant
  as Kari Kavén, Alba's adoptive father
  as Kim Ekman, lawyer, Sofia's father
 Sten Karpov as Faisal, Juri's henchman, helps track Madina
 Andrei Tusmak as Konstantin, former journalist, wannabe writer, Zara's abusive husband
 Isabelle van Hecke as "Director of Housekeeping" at Helsinki hotel, hires "Zamira"
 Rober Enckell as "Interior Minister", in charge of all policing matters
 Lilya Kervinen as Ronja Viita, Timo's daughter
 Adna Mohamed as Almaz Kosar Abdi, refugee center nurse, Jari's drug courier
 Gisele Virkkunen as Zaha Mazri, Roza's mother, generally ill, cared for by Roza
 Elina Partrakka as Sofia Ekman, Kim's daughter

Episode guide

Reception 

Dimitris Passas of Tap the Line observed Bullets strives, "to show how difficult is to judge its characters who are repeatedly making questionable, in terms of ethics and morality, decisions because of extreme circumstances." SBS-TV's Anthony Morris described the pivotal interaction between lead characters, Mari (Kosonen) and Madina (Kekilli), and explained, "[it's] about the connection between the two women as it is about the plot twists and turns you'd expect from a spy drama." TV Tonights David Knox felt, "[this is] an intelligent mix of crime serial, espionage thriller, and political drama, set against the atmospheric backdrops."

References

External links 

 

2010s Finnish television series
2018 Finnish television series debuts
Television shows set in Finland